is a song by Japanese rock band Asian Kung-Fu Generation. It was released as the second single of their third studio album, Fanclub, on February 15, 2006. The song is unique for a number of reasons. Not only was it the first single AKG released following their ten-year anniversary, it also became their first number-one single, debuting at the top of the Oricon charts. The song's b-side, "Uso to Wonderland," was also the first recording in which Kensuke Kita held the position of lead singer.

Music video
The music video for "World Apart" was directed by Nobuyuki Matsukawa, with planning by Atsushi Masachika and Satoshi Iwashita.

Track listing

Personnel
Masafumi Gotō – lead vocals, rhythm guitar
Kensuke Kita – lead guitar, background vocals
Takahiro Yamada –  bass, background vocals
Kiyoshi Ijichi – drums
Asian Kung-Fu Generation – producer
Yusuke Nakamura – single cover art

Charts

External links

References

Asian Kung-Fu Generation songs
2006 singles
Oricon Weekly number-one singles
Songs written by Masafumi Gotoh
2006 songs
Ki/oon Music singles